The 2018 ADAC Formula 4 Championship was the fourth season of the ADAC Formula 4, an open-wheel motor racing series. It was a multi-event motor racing championship that featured drivers competing in 1.4 litre Tatuus-Abarth single seat race cars that conformed to the technical regulations for the championship. It began on 14 April at Oschersleben and finished on 23 September at Hockenheim after seven triple header rounds.

The championship was dominated by US Racing – CHRS driver Lirim Zendeli, who secured the title after race three at the Nürburgring. He extended his wins tally to ten with victory in the season finale at Hockenheim. His success was key for  US Racing – CHRS teams' title. Van Amersfoort Racing driver Liam Lawson lost to Zendeli by 114 points with wins at Lausitzring and Spielberg. Prema Theodore Racing driver Enzo Fittipaldi was third with just one win, at Spielberg. Lawson's teammates Frederik Vesti and Charles Weerts were victorious at Hockenheim and Nürburgring, completing the top five in the standings. David Schumacher won the rookie title, defeating fellow German driver Niklas Krütten by 31 points.

Teams and drivers

Race calendar
Venues for the 2018 season were announced on 19 December 2017 with the first Hockenheim round and the Lausitzring round as 2018 Deutsche Tourenwagen Masters support events, while other event were scheduled to support 2018 ADAC GT Masters. The calendar was altered on 26 March 2018, filling the slot in the 2018 German Grand Prix support package, making a debut for ADAC Formula 4 in the Formula One weekend programme and becoming the first FIA Formula 4 race in the Formula One weekend slot in Europe.

Championship standings

Points were awarded to the top 10 classified finishers in each race. No points were awarded for pole position or fastest lap.

Drivers' Cup

Notes:
 – Drivers did not finish the race, but were classified as they completed more than 90% of the race distance.

Rookies' Cup

Teams' Cup

References

External links
 

ADAC Formula 4 seasons
ADAC
ADAC Formula 4
ADAC F4